Czech Open is an international floorball tournament. It takes place every year in August in Prague, Czech Republic. It is one of the largest floorball tournaments in the world. Every year over 200 teams from around the world participate. The first season was played in 1993. The tournament is organized by Prague floorball club Tatran Střešovice.

Usually, there are six categories in the tournament. Men have three categories (Elite, Pro and Open), women have two (Elite and Open) and juniors have one. In elite categories, usually sixteen teams compete. Czech teams have a number of places reserved, which are assigned according to standings of the teams in Czech floorball leagues (such as Superliga florbalu).

The most successful team in the history of the tournament is Swedish Pixbo Wallenstam IBK, with eight titles in men's and women's elite categories. By 2022, the men Elite category has been won only by three teams from the Czech Republic – 1. SC Vítkovice, Tatran Střešovice and FBC Ostrava. They won in 1998, 1999, 2020, 2021 and 2022. With an exception of 2022, those were years, when the strong Scandinavian teams did not arrive. Women Elite has also only three Czech winners – Děkanka (2006 through 2010, 2012), Tatran (1997, 2004) and Vítkovice (2020, 2021).

List of Czech Open winners

References

External links 
Official web site

Floorball competitions in the Czech Republic
International floorball competitions